Brain-specific angiogenesis inhibitor 2 is a protein that in humans is encoded by the BAI2 gene. It is a member of the adhesion-GPCR family of receptors.

BAI1, a p53-target gene, encodes brain-specific angiogenesis inhibitor, a seven-span transmembrane protein and is thought to be a member of the secretin receptor family. Brain-specific angiogenesis proteins BAI2 and BAI3 are similar to BAI1 in structure, have similar tissue specificities and may also play a role in angiogenesis.

References

External links

Further reading

G protein-coupled receptors